In Vietnamese cuisine, bì cuốn are pork and rice rolls. They are made from thinly shredded pork and skin, with rice, and ingredients often added are garlic sauce, lemon, sugar, chilli, pickles, and white radish and carrots.

See also
 List of Vietnamese dishes

References

Vietnamese pork dishes
Vietnamese rice dishes
Stuffed dishes